Massacre Time is a 1966 Italian Spaghetti Western film starring Franco Nero and George Hilton.

Plot
In New Mexico, Tom Corbett is a prospector who receives a message from a family friend named Carradine, telling him to return immediately to the home where he lived with his wealthy widowed mother. Years earlier upon her death, she left the house and land to Tom's brother Jeff, and insisted that Tom be sent away. Money was dispatched to him to support him, but her dying wish was that Tom stay away from Laramie Town. Nevertheless, Tom says goodbye to his foreman, Murray, and rides off.

Upon arrival in Laramie Town, Tom finds the house where he grew up in derelict. Tom is told by two rough-looking thugs to leave because the land belongs to a man called Mr. Scott and warned to beware when he sees the Scott sign which is a big letter 'S' stamped onto a big letter 'J'.

Riding back into town, Tom sees that the Scott sign is all over town, on the bank, the saloon, everywhere, and soon sees why the owners are afraid. Jason Scott, a wealthy businessman, rides into the town square with his sadistic son Junior Scott with a large posse of thugs surrounding them. The Scotts apprehend a family moving out of the town because of the low wages the Scotts pay them. Junior suddenly kills the elderly couple's teenage son in cold blood and laughs mechanically.

Asking around where Jeff Corbett is, Tom is led to an elderly Chinese blacksmith, named Sonko, where Jeff works. Sonko directs Tom to the residence of his employee. Tom finds Jeff living in a run-down shack on the outskirts of town along with their old Indian housemaid Mercedes. Jeff is revealed to be a drunkard, having never gotten over the loss of his mother, as well as the farm. Both Jeff and Mercedes insist that Tom leave immediately and they refuse to discuss why Tom has been summoned. They are also anxious that Tom shouldn't be seen by anyone else in town who might recognize him. Determined to find out what is going on, Tom rides back into town, observed by a few of Scott's men.

That evening at the local saloon, a bar-room brawl erupts when Jeff follows Tom and gets roughed up by Scott's men. Jeff handles himself admirably in the fight, despite being drunk. Tom joins the fray after watching his brother's antics, and the two of them stagger out together. However, Jeff continues to insist that Tom leave town. Instead, Tom visits the Carradine family to find out why the letter to him was sent. But before Carradine and Tom can discuss anything, a massacre erupts. The Carradines are all killed by shadowy assailants, but Tom escapes unharmed.

The next day, Tom learns that talking to the townsfolk about Mr. Scott only leads them to give dire warnings. Tom decides to go out himself to the Scott ranch to resolve what is going on. Jeff offers to come along with him. Despite being drunk, Jeff's shooting skills have not been dulled by his tequila intake. Jeff single-handedly shoots six of Scott's men, plus three more at a guard post to help Tom approach the isolated Scott ranch, after gaining Tom's promise that he will take the responsibility for having killed them.

Tom walks into the Scott ranch to find a high-society party in progress. He confronts Scott, but the wealthy man refuses to talk, claiming he's too busy with the party. But Junior is not so different. He gloatingly demonstrates his dexterity with a whip, giving the struggling Tom a protracted and humiliating beating in front of the assembled guests.

Back at Jeff's shack, a battered Tom is tended to by Mercedes. But a shadowy gunman passes the window and kills her. Enraged, Jeff resolves to join his brother's quest for vengeance against the Scotts. He tells Tom that a few months earlier, the Scotts had his father killed. But when Tom responds with "Our father?" Jeff snarls, "I said MY father."

The two men encounter Mr. Scott at a remote, tumble-down shack where Jeff finally reveals his secret: Mr. Scott is really Tom's father. Tom and Jeff are only half-brothers. Mr. Scott reveals that it was he who sent for him for he wants Tom to live at the ranch with him as his heir. Mr. Scott had no part in the killings of Tom's father, the Carradines, or Mercedes. He tremblingly informs Tom that Junior, Tom's younger half-brother, is insane from having been spoiled all his life by wealth and power, and he is afraid that Junior has gone too far with it. Before Mr. Scott can go on, Junior appears and shoots him dead. The rest of the Junior Scott party rides back to the ranch.

Jeff is tempted to leave the rest of the matter as a family affair, but relents and accompanies Tom on his mission to bring down Junior and his henchmen. In a long and climactic gunfight, Tom and Jeff assault the Scott ranch and kill all of Junior's henchmen. During the battle, Jeff saves Tom's life from Junior when he shoots the gun out of Junior's hand as he's about to shoot Tom in the back. The insane youth retreats from a bare-knuckle fight with Tom, and to a tussle on a narrow wooden walkway between two ranch buildings. After a brief fist-fight, the maniac Junior loses his balance as he tries to force Tom over the side and instead falls to his death, landing in a dove-coop. As several white doves fly into the air, the drunken Jeff makes as if to shoot at the birds. Tom's hand gently lowers the muzzle of Jeff's gun and shakes his head, meaning that there's no need for any more shooting.

Cast
Franco Nero as Tom Corbett 
George Hilton as Jeff Corbett
Nino Castelnuovo as Jason "Junior" Scott
Giuseppe Addobbati as Mr. Scott 
Linda Sini as Brady 
Tom Felleghy as Murray
Rina Franchetti as Mercedes
Tchang Yu as Undertaker
Aysanoa Runachagua as Sonko

Production
After the release of A Fistful of Dollars starring Clint Eastwood, a wave of Italian Spaghetti Westerns began production in Italy; among these films was Django starring Franco Nero. The screenplay for Massacre Time was primarily written by Fernando Di Leo, who entered the film business in the early 1960s as a screenwriter and assistant director; having previously co-written A Fistful of Dollars, For a Few Dollars More, A Pistol for Ringo and The Return of Ringo, Massacre Time marked his first solo screenplay credit, although Di Leo's writing partner Enzo Dell'Aquila and director Lucio Fulci made uncredited contributions. The film's title was taken from the novel Tempo di massacaro by Franco Enna. Fulci would later claim that he pushed Di Leo to make the film as violent as possible, which Di Leo refuted, stating "I don't know anything about Fulci's claims that he insisted that I write a very violent movie [...] Fulci only directed well what was already on the page [...] The script was good and ready and he liked it the way it was, otherwise I'd have complied to his demand if there had been any".

Massacre Time was originally supposed to be an Italian-Spanish co-production with Ringo co-star George Martin attached to the leading role of Tom Corbett, but the Spanish co-producers withdrew their involvement and funding  after Fulci refused to tone down the script's violence, thus preventing Martin from taking the role. Having decided to shoot the film entirely in Italy on a lower budget, Fulci instead cast Nero as Tom at the suggestion of his assistant director, Giovanni Fago, on the basis of production stills from Django. Uruguayan actor George Hilton was cast in the role of Jeffrey; reflecting on the film, Hilton described Fulci as "a difficult man to work with" with an "overbearing personality and that could be difficult."

Release
Massacre Time was released in Italy on 10 August 1966.

Although an international English-language version was made, a redubbed English version produced by American International Pictures was theatrically released in the United States in December 1968 as The Brute and the Beast, with a longer running time (88 minutes); it was one of only two Spaghetti Westerns imported to the United States by AIP, the other being God Forgives... I Don't!. It was released in the U.K. as Colt Concert. The film was marketed in Denmark and West Germany as a Django film.

Arrow Video released the film alongside My Name Is Pecos, Bandidos and And God Said to Cain as part of their Blu-ray box set Vengeance Trails: Four Classic Westerns on July 27, 2021.

Footnotes

References

External links
 

Italian Western (genre) films
Spaghetti Western films
1966 films
Films directed by Lucio Fulci
1966 Western (genre) films
Films scored by Lallo Gori
American International Pictures films
1960s Italian-language films
1960s Italian films